Costa Rica is the name of a town located about 30 minutes (by car) south of Culiacán, Sinaloa, Mexico.

Populated places in Sinaloa